Scinax tymbamirim is a frog in the family Hylidae.  It is endemic to Brazil.

Appearance

The adult male frog is 20.6 to 27.4 mm long in snout-vent length and the adult female frog 22.3 to 31.2 mm.

This frog is brown or orange-brown in color on the dorsum. It has interrupted white stripes down its sides. There is a five-sided intraocular mark, lined with yellow.  There are dark brown bars across all the front and hind legs.  Its ventrum is beige in color.  This frog has vomerine teeth in its jaw. It has disks on its toes for climbing.

Home

This frog lives in coastal lowlands up to hills and highlands 1000 meters above sea level.

Name

The scientific name of this frog comes from the Tupí-guarani language. Tymba means "animal" and mirim means "small." The scientists named this frog "small animal" because it is smaller that Scinax alter.

References

Amphibians of Brazil
Amphibians described in 2012
tymbamirim